The 1940 George Washington Colonials football team was an American football team that represented George Washington University as an independent during the 1940 college football season. In its third season under head coach William Reinhart, the team compiled a 5–3–1 record and was outscored by a total of 82 to 78.

Schedule

References

George Washington
George Washington Colonials football seasons
George Washington Colonials football